Wayne Ronald Neville (born 10 December 1954) is a former New Zealand rugby union player. A prop, Neville represented North Auckland at a provincial level, and was a member of the New Zealand national side, the All Blacks, on their 1981 tour of Romania and France. He played four matches on the tour but did not play in any internationals.

References

1954 births
Living people
People from Waipukurau
New Zealand rugby union players
New Zealand international rugby union players
Northland rugby union players
Rugby union props
People educated at Dannevirke High School
Rugby union players from the Hawke's Bay Region